A  (Hebrew: , pl. ) is an institute of Torah study for women, usually in Israel, and roughly the equivalent of a yeshiva for men. 
A "seminary" (Hebrew  seminar, sometimes seminaria) is a similar institution, more traditional in orientation.
Midrashot are Religious Zionist, while Seminaries are usually Haredi; although in English, "Seminary", or "Sem", is often used for either.

The term Midrasha is sometimes used more widely, referring to pluralistic, as opposed to Orthodox, educational institutions.
In Israel, it may also refer to field schools that organize seminars and nature field trips.

History
The Haredi aligned seminaries - for example Beth Jacob Jerusalem, and the Gateshead Jewish Academy for Girls - 
are modeled on the Bais Yaakov movement's teacher-training seminary established by Sarah Schenirer in 1923.
(Today, Beis Yaakov almost invariably refers to high school, while "Seminary" is used for a post-high school institution.)
Outside of Europe, the "Beis Yaakov Seminary, Tel Aviv"  was founded in 1933, and Jerusalem's "Beis Yaakov Institute for Teachers"  in 1939;
the first Seminary in the USA was established by Vichna Kaplan in Williamsburg, Brooklyn in 1941;
Gateshead Seminary in the UK, was founded in 1944.
The Rika Breuer Teachers Seminary - of the Breuers / Khal Adath Jeshurun community - was established in the 1960s and operated for over 40 years.
See . (And for further context, a women's seminary established in 1930, as well as  discussing the Bais Medrash L'Morim established in 1864.)

The Religious Zionist and Modern Orthodox  began to be established in the late 1970s, parallel to the Hesder yeshivot;
these include the Religious Kibbutz Movement's Midreshet Ein HaNetziv, Midreshet Lindenbaum, and Migdal Oz, sister school of Yeshivat Har Etzion.
Precedent, are the Mizrachi Teachers Training College, today's Lifshitz College of Education, which was established in Jerusalem in 1921; the Talpiot Bet Medrash for Teachers in 1937; and Machon Gold in 1958. Lindenbaum, in 1976, was the first established independent of a teacher's college.
The largest Midrasha is at Bar-Ilan University, with 800 students in its various programs.
A midrasha that offers degree studies is sometimes titled machon (institute) or michlalah (college).
The word "" is based on the term beit midrash, "house of study"; 
the root דרש means "to seek [knowledge]", and is then generalized to mean "expound". 
It is cognate with the Arabic "," which also refers to a place of learning.

Curriculum

 and seminaries vary in curriculum and hashkafah, or outlook. 

All cover the Tanakh (Bible), Jewish philosophy, practical Halacha (Jewish law;  "Halacha LeMaaseh"), and Hasidus / Musar (character development); 
topics in applied Jewish ethics, such as the "laws of speech", are usually taught separately. 
The Jewish holidays are similarly often studied as a separate topic, "Ma'agal Hashana", in terms of both philosophy and Halacha;
Tefillah, "prayer",  likewise. 
Depending on the institution's stance, the weight and role assigned to Talmud particularly, and in fact to textual-skills generally, will differ re men's yeshivot, and between schools.

Midrashot 
At Midrashot, the treatment of the Tanakh and Jewish philosophy - there referred to as Machshavah - is typically text-focused, built around chavruta-based study as at yeshivot.
This entails paired-study where assigned sources are prepared for a shiur, a lecture delivered as a discursive-review.
At some institutions, the Talmud is directly studied, as at men's yeshivot, if less intensively; others treat Talmud similar to seminaries, as below.
Regardless, Halachah will generally be studied with practice in view, as opposed to   the yeshiva approach, where the derivation is from Talmudic sources through codification. At Matan, Nishmat and Lindenbaum, the treatment is Talmud-based; see also Drisha Institute.

Women usually attend Midrasha for one year, either before or following their Sherut Leumi (national civic service); a second year is sometimes offered. Programs often emphasize Machshavah, deepening their students' religious identity at this life-stage;  this may include specific study of the writings of Rav Kook, and/or Torat Eretz Yisrael in general.

Seminaries 
Seminary programs usually span two years post high-school. Seminaries are typically more conservative in their approach than Midrashot:
selections from the Talmud - usually the non-legalistic aggadah - may be studied, but only in the context of other classes, especially philosophy and Musar;
the only section of Talmud studied directly is Pirkei Avot, comprising ethical teachings and maxims.
These institutions relatedly assign less weight to textual skills, with content delivered primarily via lecture.
As appropriate to the program in question, formal teacher training and certification is often provided

additional to these courses.

Parallel to their academic content, most Seminaries also focus on the role of women in Torah (several Midrashot similarly),
covering topics such as Tzniut (modesty), Shalom Bayit ("domestic harmony") and Chinuch (education of one's children),
and preparing students for the role of akeres habayis, or "household mainstay".
These classes often emphasize "values", as opposed to sources.

Hasidic-aligned institutions are positioned in line with the Seminaries; their curricula differ in that they emphasize the works of their respective Rebbe, and their exposure to text is often further limited. Note that some Chabad-affiliated institutions, on the other hand, offer classes in Talmud and text-based Halacha.

Israel programs
Many diaspora-based women attend  or "sem" in Israel, for a year or two ("shana bet") following high school; 
several midrashot and seminaries offer special programs here, for example Shana Ba'aretz at Nishmat, or the "Overseas Program" at Midreshet HaRova.

Additional to Torah study, as above, these programs often include an element of yediat ha’aretz (“knowledge of the Land”) comprising touring of Israel, Shabbatons in various communities, seminars with journalists and politicians, and typically volunteer work in local schools and hospitals;
often a trip to Poland is scheduled to memorealize the Holocaust.

Some institutions accommodate the newly observant with similar year-programs, designed to build foundational knowledge and skills; well known are Neve Yerushalayim, Mayanot, and Machon Roni;
Machon Chana is US based.

Certifications
Most Haredi and Hasidic seminaries offer certificates, and sometimes degrees, in Education.
In Israel, the two year certificates are jointly through the Szold Institute, and are recognized by the Israel Ministry of Education as equivalent to the national matriculation. Chabad's Beth Rivkah offers a B.A. and M.A. jointly with the Shaanan Religious College of Education; "Beth Chanah", its affiliated program in Tzfat and Jerusalem, offers a 2 year certificate.
JCT's Lustig Campus in Ramat Gan hosts degree programs for Haredi and Hasidic women;
see also The Haredi Campus - The Academic College Ono.

In the Religious Zionist community, women often continue their studies at one of the midrasha-affiliated teacher training colleges, which offer an intensive Torah-program in conjunction with the B.Ed. degree; 
(master's level) specializations are often offered in Tanakh  or Machshavah. 
The year in Midrasha is sometimes integrated with the college program.
Bar-Ilan University operates a midrasha, and students in all disciplines may then continue Torah study in parallel with their academic studies (with a requirement of at least ten courses in Judaism
).
Machon Tal, associated with JCT, the Jerusalem College of Technology, similarly offers degrees in engineering and management. 
Female faculty at Midrashot often hold Doctorates, usually from Bar-Ilan.

Some offer second-year programs with religious-studies classes in the morning and general-studies classes in the afternoons, allowing students to pursue a religious education with a college degree simultaneously.
In the US, the Modern Orthodox Stern College for Women (Yeshiva University) combines Torah and University studies, as at Bar-Ilan;
the Haredi Lander College for Women similarly.
Stern graduates often pursue Torah topics at the Masters level, through the Bernard Revel Graduate School of Jewish Studies.

In recent years 

some midrashot offer specialized programs in Halacha, comprising Talmud-intensive source study, with certifying examinations on the relevant sections of codified law in the Shulchan Aruch. 
Nishmat trains women as Yoatzot Halacha, advisors in the laws of Family purity;
Lindenbaum, through a joint program, prepares women as to'anot, advocates in religious courts for matters relating to divorce.
Three programs mirror the Rabbinate’s ordination requirement for men:
Ein Hanetziv trains students as "Teachers of Halacha", 

Lindenbaum in "Halachik leadership"

and Matan as "Halachik Respondents".

Yeshiva University offers women graduate-students a Master's program in advanced Talmud and Halacha.

Other institutions
As above, the term Midrasha is sometimes used for pluralistic, as opposed to orthodox, institutions for Torah study. These are usually structured around continuing / adult education, and accept both men and women. 
Examples in Israel are the Ein Prat Midrasha 
and the Midrasha  at the Oranim Academic College; 
elsewhere, the Melton School's Midrasha in Cape Town.
Other non-orthodox programs for women (usually egalitarian) include those at "Pardes", which offers various learning formats worldwide, and Mechon Hadar a Conservative-aligned  Bet Midrash in New York.
(Oranim, in partnership with the Shalom Hartman Institute, in fact offers a pluralistic ordination to both men and women.)

Within the Orthodox community, continuing-education programs for women, similar to these, are also offered, 
for example by  Matan
and Emunah,
while Midreshet Afikim is a program for high-school students.
The LSJS Women's Midrasha programme 

similarly provides regular text-based classes;
other UK based programs include "Ma’ayan" and "Bradfield".
Mizrachi's "Lapidot" program  comprises weekly training in Mishna, Gemara and Halacha, and Machshava.
Many diaspora synagogues host a "campus midrasha" or suchlike,  offering scheduled daily classes on various topics; many also host a
"Community Kollel", which has a corresponding function, and offers adult education to both men and women (usually separately).

In the United States, the term Midrasha is also used for programs where high school students can continue their Jewish education post bar / bat mitzvah. 

In Israel, the term is used also in wider contexts. 
Midreshet Ben-Gurion - also known as Midreshet Sde Boker - is an educational center and boarding school in the south.
Eshkolot operates "midrashot" aimed at knowledge of the land of Israel.
Beit Berl College's school of art is called "HaMidrasha".

See also
 Beis Yaakov
 
 Female seminary
 
 
 
 List of Midrashot & 
 
 
 Ulpana
 WebYeshiva – advanced course-based Torah study for men and women, including the 3 year "Halacha Mastery Program"
 Women in Judaism and esp. #Views on the education of women
 
 Yeshivot ordaining women:
 Beit Midrash Har'el (Orthodox)
 Maharat (Open Orthodox)

Notes

References

Jewish educational institutions
Modern Orthodox Judaism
Orthodox Jewish schools for women
Hebrew words and phrases